Meyrignac-l'Église is a commune in the Corrèze department in central France.

The village is the smallest town ever to host the opening of a stage of the Tour de France in 1998.

Population

See also
Communes of the Corrèze department

References

Communes of Corrèze